The 1997 World Junior Figure Skating Championships was a figure skating competition sanctioned by the International Skating Union in which younger figure skaters competed for the title of World Junior Champion. It was held from November 24 to December 1, 1996 in Seoul, South Korea. Due to the large number of participants, the men's and ladies' qualifying groups were split into groups A and B.

Medals table

Results

Men

Ladies

Pairs

Ice dancing

References

External links
 results

World Junior Figure Skating Championships
1996 in figure skating
F
Sport in Seoul
World Junior 1997